Flat Scooba Creek is a stream in the U.S. state of Mississippi.

Scooba is a name derived from the Choctaw language purported to mean "reed brake".

References

Rivers of Mississippi
Rivers of Kemper County, Mississippi
Mississippi placenames of Native American origin